The metical is the currency of Mozambique, abbreviated with the symbol MZN or MT. It is nominally divided into 100 centavos. The name metical comes from Arabic  (mithqāl), a unit of weight and an alternative name for the gold dinar coin that was used throughout much of Africa until the 19th century.

History

First metical 
The metical replaced the escudo at par on 16 June 1980. It was divided into 100 centavos. The metical underwent severe inflation. After the revaluation of the Romanian leu on 1 July 2005, the metical briefly became the least valued currency unit, at a value of about 24,500 meticais per USD, until the Zimbabwean dollar took the title in late August 2005.

Second metical 

On July 1, 2006, Mozambique redenominated the metical at a rate of 1000:1. New coins and banknotes were introduced on July 1, 2006, and the transitional period during which both old and new meticais could be used lasted until December 31, 2006. During the conversion, the new currency was locally abbreviated as MTn, but has since largely returned to MT.

Old meticais were redeemed by the Bank of Mozambique for a period of six years, until December 31, 2012.

Coins

First metical
In 1980, coins were introduced in denominations of 50 centavos, 1, 5,  10 and 20 meticais. The 50 centavos,  and 5 meticais were minted in aluminium, with the 1 metical in brass and the 10 and 20 meticais in cupro-nickel. In 1986, aluminium 1, 10, 20 and 50 meticais were introduced. A new coinage issued in 1994 was composed of 1, 5, 10, 20, 50, 100, 500 and 1000 meticais, with the lower four denominations in brass clad steel and the higher denominations in nickel clad steel. 5000 meticais coins were introduced in 1998, followed by 10,000 meticais in 2003.

Second metical
From July 1, 2006, coins were issued in denominations of 1, 5, 10, 20, 50 centavos and 1, 2, 5, 10 meticais.

Banknotes

First metical
The First Metical had three issues of notes as follows:
i. In 1980 (16 June 1980), notes were introduced in denominations of 50, 100, 500 and 1,000 meticais.
ii The same notes and denominations were reissued in 1983 (16 June 1983) with the new state logo, 5,000 meticais notes were introduced in 1989 (3 February 1989).
iii. In 1991 (16 June 1991) 500, 1,000, 5,000, and 10,000 notes were issued followed by 50,000 and 100,000 meticais in 1993 (16 June 1993), 20,000 meticais in 1999 (16 June 1999) and 200,000 and 500,000 meticais in 2003 (16 June 2003).

Second metical

From July 1, 2006, new banknotes were issued in denominations of 20, 50, 100, 200, 500, and 1000 meticais. On October 1, 2011, Banco de Moçambique has issued a new family of banknotes that are similar to the 2006 series, but with enhanced security features. The three smaller denominations are now printed on polymer while the higher denominations remain printed on paper. The higher denominated metical banknotes are printed by De La Rue.

See also
 Economy of Mozambique

References

External links
 
 Banco de Moçambique  - Bank of Mozambique (Portuguese)
 Historical banknotes of Mozambique 

Currencies of Mozambique
Currencies introduced in 1980
Currencies of the Commonwealth of Nations